The following is an alphabetical list of countries in the United Nations geoscheme for the Americas grouped by subregion and (if applicable) intermediate region. Note that the continent of North America comprises the intermediate regions of the Caribbean, Central America, and Northern America.

Latin America and the Caribbean

Caribbean

Central America

South America

Northern America

See also 
 Americas (terminology)
 List of continents and continental subregions by population
 List of countries by United Nations geoscheme
 List of regions of Latin America
 United Nations geoscheme
 United Nations geoscheme for Africa, Asia, Europe, and Oceania
 United Nations Statistics Division

References 

Americas, the
Geography of the Americas